The Maserati 6CM is an Italian single-seater racing car, made by Maserati of Modena from 1936 to 1940 for the Voiturette racing class. Twenty-seven were built on the Maserati 4CM frame, with front suspension as on the Maserati V8RI, and had a successful racing career from 1936 to 1939. The 6CM was introduced to the world at the 1936 Milan Motor Show. Maserati spent much of its early years manufacturing cars for privateers in the racing field. The Maserati 6CM is no exception.

Engine 
Specifics of the first chassis built: 
 inline-6 engine
two overhead valves per cylinder, mounted at 90 degrees
Roots type supercharger
Weber carburetor 55ASI
Scintilla ignition
Pirelli tyres

The engine consists of six cylinders in-line, with two overhead valves per cylinder. Also, the car has a Scintilla ignition system as well as a single Roots-type supercharger and a Weber carburetor 55ASI.

Basic information 
It contains a single  (31.7 gallon) gasoline tank. The tyres on the model are different from front to back, with the rear tyres being narrower and taller. It weighs .

Successes in racing 
The 6CM was a successful car in the racing world. It held victories in Europe, which was a powerhouse at the time for grand prix racing. With the rise of Adolf Hitler in 1933, the racing world  became even more competitive. Hitler wanted to prove that the Germans were the best at everything, including motor racing.  Hitler funded both Daimler- Mercedes and Auto Union.  This created the drive to make a better car for the grand prix circuit and thus, the 6CM was born.

Chassis 1532 
One of the twenty seven constructed was raced by Count Felice "Didi" Trossi to victory in four of the five races in which he competed. In the race he did not win he came second. The most "rewarding" race victory came at Monaco.

Chassis 1531 
Despite not winning with Count Trossi, the car was highly competitive with American driver Harry Schell in big races such as at Monaco and Goodwood.

Successes at Modena 
Maserati's "home track" in Modena was the home of victories for Maserati in the mid to late thirties. Modena was the site for three separate Maserati victories, one in the 4CM in 1935, and the 6CM was victorious in both 1936 and 1938.

Other chassis and racers 
Most cars were sold to private owners such as Austin Dobson, Lord Howe and John Peter Wakefield. Among the private teams that ran 6CMs were Scuderia Ambrosiana and Ecurie Helvetica.  Maserati's works team also raced them successfully, including in the Grand Prix of Naples and the Targa Florio, with drivers Aldo Marazza, Luigi Villoresi and Ettore Bianco.

8CTF 
The 8CTF was a modified 6CM, with a supercharged 3L 365 hp engine in an attempt to compete with the all-conquering Mercedes and Auto Union cars. The chassis was modified and lengthened to fit the bigger engine. During the 1938 Donington Grand Prix, Rudolf Uhlenhaut, the technical director of the Mercedes racing department checked out an 8CTF entered by Luigi Villoresi for this race. He was so impressed with the car that he remarked that if the Mercedes team had prepared the 8CTF, it could have won the race against Mercedes and Auto Unions.

References

External links

maserati.org.au on the 6CM (pictures)

6CM
Grand Prix cars